Crescent Glacier is a small alpine glacier in Antarctica.  It is located just east of Howard Glacier in the Kukri Hills, flowing north into Taylor Valley in Victoria Land. The glacier was studied by U.S. geologist Troy L. Pewe in December 1957, and was so named by him because of its crescent shape when viewed from the floor of Taylor Valley.

See also
 List of glaciers in the Antarctic
 Glaciology
 Gurkha Peak

References
 

Glaciers of McMurdo Dry Valleys